John N. Harms (born February 17, 1940)  is a politician from the U.S. state of Nebraska. He served two terms in the Nebraska Legislature from 2007 to 2015.  Harms is a former president of Western Nebraska Community College.

Harms graduated from Morrill High School in 1958.  He earned a bachelor's degree and a master of science degree in secondary education from Chadron State College and an Ed.D. in higher educational administration from Montana State University. He began his professional career as a high school teacher in Gering, Nebraska and served in a variety of educational positions culminating with the presidency of Western Nebraska Community College, a position he attained in 1976.

In 2006, Harms retired from the college to run for the state legislature.  He defeated Gering dentist George Schlothauer, winning 58% of the vote to Schlothauer's 42%.

Harms ran unopposed for re-election to his legislative seat in 2010.

Due to Nebraska's term-limits law, Harms was ineligible to run for a third consecutive term in 2014.  He was succeeded by John Stinner.

References

 

Harms, John N.
Harms, John N.
Harms, John N.
Harms, John N.
People from Morrill County, Nebraska
People from Scottsbluff, Nebraska